Elaine Patricia Edwards Bucklo (born October 1, 1944) is a senior United States district judge of the United States District Court for the Northern District of Illinois.

Education and career

Born in Chelsea, Massachusetts, Bucklo received an Artium Baccalaureus degree from Saint Louis University in 1966 and a Juris Doctor from Northwestern University School of Law in 1972. She was a law clerk to Judge Robert Sprecher of the United States Court of Appeals for the Seventh Circuit from 1972 to 1973, and was thereafter in private practice in Chicago, Illinois from 1973 to 1978 and from 1980 to 1985, having been a visiting professor of law at the UC Davis School of Law from 1978 to 1980. She was then a United States magistrate judge for the United States District Court for the Northern District of Illinois from 1985 to 1994.

Federal judicial service

On August 16, 1994, Bucklo was nominated by President Bill Clinton to a seat on the United States District Court for the Northern District of Illinois vacated by John Albert Nordberg. She was confirmed by the United States Senate on October 7, 1994, and received her commission on October 11, 1994. She assumed senior status on October 31, 2009.

References

External links 

1944 births
Living people
Lawyers from Chelsea, Massachusetts
Judges of the United States District Court for the Northern District of Illinois
United States district court judges appointed by Bill Clinton
Saint Louis University alumni
Northwestern University Pritzker School of Law alumni
United States magistrate judges
People from Chelsea, Massachusetts
20th-century American judges
21st-century American judges
20th-century American women judges
21st-century American women judges